Gao Sheng may refer to:

 Gao Sheng (rebel), a character in the Three Kingdoms
 Gao Sheng (footballer) (born 1962), Chinese former footballer and current manager